Šalamunić is a village in Lika, Croatia, located in the Udbina municipality, between Korenica and Lički Osik. The population is 38 (census 2011).

References

Populated places in Lika-Senj County
Serb communities in Croatia